Hermania is a genus of gastropods belonging to the family Philinidae.

The species of this genus are found in Europe, Japan.

Species:

Hermania indistincta 
Hermania infantilis 
Hermania scabra

References

Philinidae